The UEFA European Championship is an association football competition established in 1960. It is contested by the men's national teams of the members of the Union of European Football Associations (UEFA), the sport's European governing body, and takes place every four years. This list covers the Finals tournament only; qualifying matches are not included.

List of European Championship red cards

References

Red cards
Euro red cards